Neutralism may refer to:

Biology 
 Neutral theory of molecular evolution

Politics 
 Neutral country
 Nonalignment (disambiguation)